

314001–314100 

|-id=040
| 314040 Tavannes ||  || Tavannes is a municipality of the Swiss canton of Bern. || 
|-id=082
| 314082 Dryope ||  || Dryope was the daughter of King Dryops. || 
|}

314101–314200 

|-id=163
| 314163 Kittenberger || 2005 GX || Kálmán Kittenberger (1881–1958), a Hungarian traveller, African researcher, zoologist, teacher, hunter and writer on natural history. || 
|}

314201–314300 

|-bgcolor=#f2f2f2
| colspan=4 align=center | 
|}

314301–314400 

|-bgcolor=#f2f2f2
| colspan=4 align=center | 
|}

314401–314500 

|-bgcolor=#f2f2f2
| colspan=4 align=center | 
|}

314501–314600 

|-bgcolor=#f2f2f2
| colspan=4 align=center | 
|}

314601–314700 

|-id=650
| 314650 Neilnorman ||  || Neil Norman (born 1972) is a British astronomer, writer, broadcaster, humorist and creator of the Comet Watch internet resource. He is a Fellow of the Royal Astronomical Society and creator of the Solar System Bodies and Minor Solar System Bodies internet resources. || 
|}

314701–314800 

|-bgcolor=#f2f2f2
| colspan=4 align=center | 
|}

314801–314900 

|-id=808
| 314808 Martindutertre ||  || Saint-Martin-du-Tertre is a French town to the north of Paris that is twinned with the municipality of San Marcello Piteglio, the discovery site for this minor planet. || 
|}

314901–315000 

|-id=988
| 314988 Sireland ||  || Sarah Ireland (born 1996), interested in the pursuit of astronomical knowledge, following in the Canadian tradition of astronomical excellence and embodying the spirit of Beyond the International Year of Astronomy. || 
|}

References 

314001-315000